Emelio Martinello (January 6, 1931 – March 24, 2022) was a professional football player as part of the Brantford Redskins of the Ontario Rugby Football Union and then thirteen seasons as a defensive lineman in the Canadian Football League, becoming a CFL east all-star in 1960 and 1961 for the Toronto Argonauts, winning a Grey Cup with the Hamilton Tiger-Cats in his next to last season. Martinello died in 2022 at the age of 91.

References

1931 births
2022 deaths
Canadian people of Italian descent
Canadian football defensive linemen
BC Lions players
Hamilton Tiger-Cats players
Montreal Alouettes players
Toronto Argonauts players
Players of Canadian football from Nova Scotia
People from Sydney, Nova Scotia
Sportspeople from the Cape Breton Regional Municipality